National security is the security of a nation state.

National Security may refer to:

 National Security (2003 film), American film directed by Dennis Dugan
 National Security (2012 film), South Korean film directed by Chung Ji-young

See also 
 
 
 League of National Security, Australian 1930s far-right group
 National defense (disambiguation)